Muhammad Suhail Shaheen (Pashto/Dari: ,) is a Taliban member who is currently the head of the Political Office in Doha. He edited the English-language, state-owned Afghan newspaper The Kabul Times during the first Islamic Emirate of Afghanistan (1996–2001), before being appointed to Afghanistan's Embassy in Pakistan as a deputy ambassador.

The Taliban-led government appointed him as the Permanent Representative of Afghanistan to the United Nations in September 2021, but the UN rejected his appointment to the post.

Early life

Suhail was born in the Paktia Province of Afghanistan. He was educated in Pakistan, and he is known to be a prolific writer and fluent speaker of English and Urdu in addition to his native Pashto. Suhail studied at the International Islamic University Islamabad and Kabul University.

Career
During the period of the Taliban's original Islamic Emirate (1996–2001), Shaheen served as Afghanistan's Deputy Ambassador at the Afghan Embassy in Pakistan. During the later phase of the Taliban's insurgency (2013–2021), he served as one of the Taliban's official spokesmen at their political office in Doha, where he gave many interviews to international media channels.

On 20 September 2021, the Taliban-led government of the Islamic Emirate of Afghanistan nominated him to become Afghanistan's official envoy to the United Nations. Shaheen however would be unable to take over the post unless the United Nations Credentials Committee accepts Shaheen's appointment. The UN has rejected recognizing Shaheen as the official Afghan representative and instead recognizes Muhammad Wali Naeemi, the ambassador of the now-ousted government of the Islamic Republic of Afghanistan.

In October 2021, Shaheen rejected American help in fighting the Islamic State – Khorasan Province, saying, "We are able to tackle Daesh independently."

See also
 Naeem Wardak

References

External links
 
 Afghanistan: Taliban spokesman Suhail Shaheen calls the BBC – interview in full, BBC News, 15 August 2021

Living people
Taliban leaders
Taliban spokespersons
People from Paktia Province
Afghan expatriates in Pakistan
Afghan politicians
Afghan journalists
Kabul University alumni
International Islamic University, Islamabad alumni
21st-century Afghan writers
Year of birth missing (living people)